The 1974–75 Rugby Union County Championship was the 75th edition of England's County Championship rugby union club competition.

Gloucestershire won their 12th title after defeating Eastern Counties in the final.

First Round 

+Eastern Counties won three way play off

Second Round

Semi finals

Final

See also
 English rugby union system
 Rugby union in England

References

Rugby Union County Championship
County Championship (rugby union) seasons